is a song recorded by Japanese duo Yoasobi from their second EP, The Book 2 (2021). It was released as a stand-alone digital single on May 10, 2021, through Sony Music Entertainment Japan. Written by Ayase and based on Chiharu's short story Meguru, the song is a piano pop song, telling about giving the courage to take a little more at the beginning of a day. The song featured as a theme song for Fuji TV's morning news, Mezamashi TV.

Upon its release, the song received acclaim from music critics, who complimented its encouragement lyricism, comfortable, warm and gentle feeling, and friendly and colorful voice. An accompanying music video was premiered on November 22. Commercially, the song debuted atop the Oricon Digital Singles Chart with 53,000 download units, and number four on both the Oricon Combined Singles Chart and Billboard Japan Hot 100, and also charted on the  Global 200 and top 40 of Global Excl. US.

Background and release

On January 18, 2021, Yoasobi announced they will be in charge of singing and writing a new theme song for Mezamashi TV, Fuji TV's morning news since April 2021. The new theme song would be based on a short story which was chosen from contest  held by Mezamashi TV and a novel website operated by Sony Music Entertainment Japan, Monogatary.com. The selected short story was announced on March 15, titled , which was written by Chiharu, from a total of 5,605 short stories. It is about a chain of small happiness, starting from a slight happening that occurs in three characters: salaryman, elderly woman, and high school girl, who saw the same fortune-telling in the morning.

The title of the song "Mō Sukoshi Dake" was announced on March 29, and used as a theme song for the program for one year since the same day. The full song was aired on May 4 on their radio show Yoasobi's All Night Nippon X and released officially on May 10 to digital music and streaming platforms. The cover artwork was designed by Hmng, an animation director and character creator, showing a world view of the short story and the music from the fortune-telling of the television screen, and the illustration cuts out the moment when the high school girl goes out, which appears in the based short story. Later, "Mō Sukoshi Dake" was included on their second EP The Book 2, released on December 1. The English version of the song, titled "Just a Little Steps", was included on the duo's second English-language EP E-Side 2, released on November 18, 2022.

Lyrics and composition

"Mō Sukoshi Dake" is a refreshing light melody and light tempo piano pop song written by Ayase, a member of the group, and composed in the key of G♯ major, 100 beats per minute with a running time of 3 minutes and 40 seconds. The lyrics describe giving the courage to take just a little more at the beginning of each person's day. Yoasobi describes "Mō Sukoshi Dake" as a song make a listener feel like a good day whether it's a refreshing or gloomy morning.

Critical reception

Rockin'On Japan Miho Takahashi has described "Mō Sukoshi Dake" "matches the timing when you want to take a break", "the song is sung as if walking as usual and saying 'if you can step a little further' and 'may you find a little happiness'", and "Ikura's friendly and colorful voice matches the song and it makes comfortable feeling". Utaten MarSali wrote that "the song expresses the message contained in Meguru along with the charm of music", and "the meaning of the lyrics will be deeper and more memorable if listen to the song after reading the short story". Salute Project stated that "the song made me warm and gentle" and "I want to be kinder and kinder to others by one step than now from tomorrow".

Music video

An accompanying music video of "Mō Sukoshi Dake" was premiered on November 22, 2021, at 8:00 AM (JST). Directed and made animation by Hmng, who also design the cover artwork, the music video depicts a warm chain of kindness and compassion of people as the based novel.

Commercial performance

In Japan's Oricon weekly chart issue dated May 24, 2021, "Mō Sukoshi Dake" debuted at number one on the Digital Single (Single Track) Chart with 53,131 download units, becoming the fifth song that charted number one on the chart and made Yoasobi becoming the third most number-one song artist on the Oricon Digital Single Chart history ("Yoru ni Kakeru", "Gunjō", "Kaibutsu", "Yasashii Suisei" and "Mō Sukoshi Dake"), along with Hikaru Utada, behind Kenshi Yonezu (7 songs) and Bump of Chicken (6 songs). The song also debuted at number four on both the Combined Singles Chart with 43,062 points and the Streaming Chart with 6,542,525 streams.

"Mō Sukoshi Dake" also debuted at number four on the Billboard Japan Hot 100 for the chart issue date of May 19, 2021 with 11,097 points, behind Hey! Say! JUMP's "Negative Fighter", HKT48's "Kimi to Dokoka e Ikitai" and Twice's "Kura Kura", marked the duo's best-debuted number song on the chart. The song also debuted and topped of the Download Songs chart with 45,931 units and number four on the Streaming Songs chart with 7,022,437 streams. On Billboard Global 200 and Global Excl. U.S charts of May 22, "Mō Sukoshi Dake" debuted at numbers 147 and 57, respectively, and peaked at number 103 and 38, respectively for the chart issue date of May 29.

Live performance and usage in media

Yoasobi performed "Mō Sukoshi Dake" for the first time at the free online concert collaborated with Uniqlo's T-shirt brand UT, Sing Your World via the duo's official YouTube channel on July 4, where the song was the number three. They gave a television debut performance of "Mō Sukoshi Dake" on December 1 at Fuji TV's 2021 FNS Music Festival. Besides featuring Mezamashi TV, "Mō Sukoshi Dake" was also chosen as a theme song for the drama produced by Mezamashi TV of the same name as the based novel, titled Meguru, broadcast in December 2021.

Credits and personnel

Credits adapted from The Book 2 liner notes and YouTube.

Song
 Ayase – producer, songwriter
 Ikura – vocals
 AssH – guitar
 Chiharu – based story writer
 Takayuki Saitō – vocal recording
 Masahiko Fukui – mixing
 Hmng – cover artwork design

Music video
 Hmng – director, animation
 Bivi – movie
 Minori Homura – assistant
 Shig – assistant

Charts

Weekly charts

Year-end charts

Certifications

Release history

References

External links
 Meguru on Monogatary.com

2021 singles
2021 songs
Japanese-language songs
Sony Music Entertainment Japan singles
Television theme songs
Yoasobi songs